The following is a list of players of the now-defunct Indianapolis Olympians professional basketball team.

Cliff Barker
Leo Barnhorst
Ralph Beard
Leon Blevins
Dillard Crocker
Bob Evans
Joe Graboski
Alex Groza
Bruce Hale
Don Hanrahan
Marshall Hawkins
Kleggie Hermsen
Joe Holland
Wallace Jones
Bob Lavoy
Don Lofgran
John Mahnken
Mal McMullen
Ed Mikan
Chuck Mrazovich
Bob Naber
Ralph O'Brien
Jack Parkinson
Mel Payton
Gene Rhodes
Carl Shaeffer
Bill Tosheff
Floyd Volker
Paul Walther
Zeke Zawoluk

References
Indianapolis Olympians all-time roster @ basketball-reference.com

National Basketball Association all-time rosters